Hollywood a Go-Go was a Los Angeles-based music variety show that ran in syndication from 1965 to 1966. The show was hosted by Sam Riddle, with music by The Sinners and dancing by The Gazzarri Dancers. It was filmed at the KHJ-TV studios in Los Angeles. Rights to surviving footage of the show (preserved on kinescope film) are now represented by Research Video.

History
The program originated as a local series, Ninth Street West, on KHJ-TV (Channel 9) in 1964, which proved to be such a success that it transformed into the nationally syndicated Hollywood a Go-Go. Its original syndicator was Four Star Television. The first episode of Hollywood a Go-Go aired in March 1965 and ceased production in 1966, with some television stations airing the show as late as the summer of 1966. In its brief run (52 episodes), the show featured various well-known acts. The Sinners were the house band featuring Eddie Kaplan on lead guitar.

After viewing the debut episode in 1965, a Billboard reviewer wrote: One gets the feeling of being amidst a Zulu uprising or witnessing a contemporary interpretation of Dante's Inferno. Host Sam Riddle...introduces his guests shouting at the top of his voice to the accompaniment of jungle drums (there must be a message in there somewhere). The set is reminiscent of a speakeasy or a prison yard with its stone wall backdrop...During the lip-synched performances of the guest artists, members of the Gazzari [sic] dancers swing, sway, weave and gyrate with flailing arms from a postage stamp sized stage, step ladders and other lofty perches...The tempo is mostly upbeat with the emphasis on the driving, breast-beating sounds. With more than half of this nation's population seen to be under 25 years of age, there is much practical economics in this programming.

List of performers 

 Ike & Tina Turner
 The Rolling Stones
 The Everly Brothers
 Frankie Lymon
 Marvin Gaye
 Edwin Starr
 The Ronettes
 Del Shannon
 Bobby Vee
 Peter and Gordon
 Smokey Robinson & the Miracles
 The Challengers
 The Impressions
 James Brown
 Jackie Wilson
 Rick Nelson
 Lesley Gore
 Fontella Bass
 Wilson Pickett
 James Darren
 Tommy Roe
 Booker T & The MGs
 Bo Diddley
 Freddy Cannon
 Sonny & Cher
 Jackie DeShannon
 Sam the Sham
 The Byrds
 The Turtles
 The Toys
 The Beau Brummels
 Bobby Fuller Four
 The Knickerbockers
 The Fugitives
 Lou Christie
 Bob Lind
 The Kingsmen
 Roy Head
 Bobby Freeman
 Billy Joe Royal
 The Association
 Glen Campbell
 P. J. Proby
 Chuck Berry
 Aretha Franklin

External links
GazzarriDancers.com - History of Hollywood A Go-Go
GazzarriDancers.com - Hollywood A Go-Go episode guide with original Los Angeles air dates

Notes 

1960s American music television series
1960s American variety television series
1965 American television series debuts
1966 American television series endings
Black-and-white American television shows
Dance television shows
First-run syndicated television programs in the United States
Television series by 20th Century Fox Television